Sally W. Walker (February 5, 1929 – August 19, 2004) was an American politician who served as a member of the Washington House of Representatives  from 1985 to 1990.  She represented Washington's 28th legislative district as a Republican, serving as the Republican Caucus Vice Chair in 1989.  She resigned on September 28, 1990.

References

1929 births
2004 deaths
Republican Party members of the Washington House of Representatives
Women state legislators in Washington (state)